Shandan is a county in Gansu, China.

Shandan may also refer to:

Shandan, Khash, village in Sistan and Baluchestan Province, Iran
Shandan, South Khorasan, village in Iran